The Formula E Gen3, also known as Spark Gen3 or simply Gen3, is an electric formula race car designed for use in the FIA Formula E Championship. The car is the successor to the SRT05e, and is constructed by Spark Racing Technology. It will be used as the base car for all manufacturers and teams from the 2022–23 Formula E World Championship onwards.

Development
In July 2020 it was announced that Spark Racing Technology would build the chassis and supply the front axles, Williams Advanced Engineering would supply the batteries, and Hankook would supply all-weather tires that incorporate bio-material and sustainable rubber.

Specifications 

References 

Open wheel racing cars
Electric sports cars
Formula E